Jerome Baker Designs is a Las Vegas, Nevada based company in the cannabis industry formerly known as Jerome Baker Designs, and for having created the largest bong ever created at 24-feet high and 800 pounds. The bong was so large it had to be  created in parts and assembled at the Cannabition, where it was put on display at “Bongzilla,” the gallery opening of Jerome Baker Designs’ Las Vegas Studio during which “The Mega Bong Series" was unveiled.

Baker started his career in glassblowing in 1991 by apprenticing with Bob Snodgrass. Since then, he has created blown glass artwork for celebrities, rock stars and sports figures.

In 2003, the company's founder, Jason Harris, who is considered by Leafly one of the top 11 glass artists who changed the cannabis glass art game, was arrested by federal law-enforcement officers in a sting operation called Operation Pipe Dreams for making and distributing paraphernalia. Tommy Chong of Cheech and Chong was also arrested in the operation. Harris did not serve time, though his assets were seized. Jerome Baker Designs had been a leading cannabis glass company throughout the 1990s and early 2000s prior to the arrest.

The company was founded by Jason Harris, who started his career in glassblowing in 1991 by apprenticing with Bob Snodgrass. Since then, Harris has created blown glass artwork for celebrities, rock stars and sports figures, including celebrity rapper Snoop Dogg, for whom Jerome Baker teamed up with Nastee Glass to produce a $18,000 nug jug capable of holding one pound of cannabis flower.

Harris is featured in Degenerate Art, a 2011 documentary by American pipe maker Aaron Golbert on the art and culture associated with glass pipes used for smoking cannabis.

World's Largest Bong 

Jerome Baker made the world's largest bong (“Bongzilla”) in 2018, finishing it over the 4/20 weekend. The piece, which was assembled at the Cannabition museum in downtown Las Vegas Arts District, looms 24-feet high and weighs 800 pounds.

The blow, which was not open to the public, happened in a studio rented by a group of renowned glass artists in South Lake Union April 19 to 22.

Harris, who designed the glass blowing program at the University of Oregon, called the environment while blowing the piece “an intense dance of blood, sweat, tears and laughter.”

To hit “Bongzilla”, reported American weekly magazine Newsweek, “someone will have to stand at the top of a staircase as a partner below lights the weed with a blowtorch and sends smoke curling through the massive pipe.” Harris called the bong “a giant metaphor.”

The bong was a classic design of a shaft and a bubble. The glassblowers added uranium to the glass to produce a bright green glow.

Operation Pipe Dreams 

U.S. Marshals and undercover agents from several law enforcement agencies at state and federal levels raided in 2003 the central Oregon offices of Jerome Baker, called back then Jerome Baker Designs Inc. (or "JBD" for shorthand), during Operation Pipe Dreams. JBD at the time was among the largest glass-pipe manufacturers on the West Coast of the United States. Harris was arrested on charges of selling drug paraphernalia. After house arrest in Oregon, he moved to Maui where he set up a studio.

The operation cracked down on all glass producers in the industry. All Jerome Baker Designs assets were seized, Harris was sentenced to one year under house arrest, and 5 years in federal probation. His website JeromeBaker.com had been seized from him, along with all inventory. Once Harris' house arrest was completed, he packed his bags and moved from Eugene, Oregon to Maui, Hawaii, where he laid low and made high end art glass for select clients.

Awards 
2020 Cannabis Business Awards & World of Cannabis Museum - 420 ICONS Award - Top 100 Cannabis Influencers of All Time
2019 Las Vegas Cannabis Awards - Lifetime Achievement Award
2019 Cannabis Business Awards - Most innovative product
2019 Las Vegas High Desert High Times Cannabis Cup 1st place best booth
2019 Las Vegas High Desert High Times Cannabis Cup 1st place best product
2019 Northern California High Times Cannabis Cup 1st place best glass
2018 Northern California High Times Cannabis Cup 2nd place best glass
2002 Amsterdam Netherlands High Times Cannabis Cup 1st place Best Glass
1998  Amsterdam Netherlands High Times Cannabis Cup  1st place Best HEMP product
1997 Amsterdam Netherlands High Times Cannabis Cup 1st place best booth
1995 Amsterdam Netherlands High Times Cannabis Cup 1st place best product
1995 Amsterdam Netherlands High Times Cannabis Cup 2nd place best booth

https://en.wikipedia.org/wiki/Rubik%27s_Cube

References

Glassblowers
Artists from Eugene, Oregon
Living people
Year of birth missing (living people)
Place of birth missing (living people)
Sculptors from Oregon